Walur is a major village in Sailu taluka of Parbhani district in Maharashtra state of India. Walur is also famous for ancient valmiki rishi temple placed in center of the village. There are some unconfirmed stories/ truths about the presence of valmiki rishi in walur. The stories states that before being known as valmiki rishi he was not aware of his abilities  of writing and was not a devotee of lord RAMA. As guided by narada, valmiki started chanting word 'MARA' and after few years the word turned out as 'RAMA'. Huge anthills formed around valmiki rishi and then he got name of VALMIKI. The unconfirmed stories from this area states valmiki rishi chanted the name of RAMA in Walur and anthill formed around him. As anthill means warul in marathi language the name of village was inspired by it. Before some year the name warul turned out as Walur.

Demography
Walur is a village with total 2100 families residing. The Walour village has population of 11008 of which 5652 are males while 5356 are females as per Population Census 2011.

Average Sex Ratio of Walur village is 948 which is higher than Maharashtra state average of 929.

Walur village has lower literacy rate compared to Maharashtra. In 2011, literacy rate of Walour village was 66.93% compared to 82.34% of Maharashtra. In Walour Male literacy stands at 75.82% while female literacy rate was 57.67%.

Schedule Caste (SC) constitutes 8.82% while Schedule Tribe (ST) were 1.49% of total population in Walour village.

Transport
It is located  towards north from district headquarters Parbhani.  from Sailu.  from State capital Mumbai.

Government and Politics
Walur comes under Parbhani (Lok Sabha constituency) for Indian general elections and current member of Parliament representing this constituency is Sanjay Haribhau Jadhav of Shiv Sena.

Walur comes under Jintur (Vidhan Sabha constituency) for assembly elections of Maharashtra. Current representative from this constituency in Maharashtra state assembly is meghna bordikar sakore  of bhartiy janta Party.

References

Villages in Parbhani district
Parbhani district